This is a list of notable events in country music that took place in 2017.

Events 
 April 3 – Luke Bryan's "Fast" reaches No. 1 on Country Airplay, making Bryan the first artist ever to achieve six No. 1 singles from the same album.
 April 11 – Jeff Cook of Alabama announces he will stop touring with the band, after revealing he was diagnosed with Parkinson's disease four years earlier.
 April 23 – The Andrew Johnson Hotel in Knoxville, Tennessee, where Hank Williams stayed December 31, 1952, hours before his death, makes headlines after mayor Tim Burchett announces that Knox County would seek proposals to redevelop the building, sparking re-interest in the circumstances and events surrounding Williams' final hours.
 May 4 – Loretta Lynn suffers a stroke at her Hurricane Mills, Tennessee ranch weeks after celebrating her 85th birthday at the Ryman Auditorium in Nashville, Tennessee. Lynn is said to make a full recovery but postpones numerous shows.
 August – Taylor Swift sues and prevails in a civil trial against David Mueller, a former morning show personality for Denver's KYGO-FM, in connection with an incident in 2013 – when Swift was still touring and being billed as primarily a country music performer – where Swift accused Mueller of sexually assaulting her by groping her at an event. Mueller later sued Swift, accusing her of lying and causing him to be fired from his job at KYGO, but Swift countersued for sexual assault. During the trial, a jury rejects Mueller's claims and rules in favor of Swift. In December, Swift, as a result of the 2013 incident and subsequent civil trial, is one of the "Silence Breakers" named Times 2017 Person of the Year
 August 12 – "Body Like a Back Road" by Sam Hunt breaks two Billboard Hot Country Songs chart records for No. 1 longevity within a month of each other. On July 22, upon spending its 22nd week at No. 1, "... Back Road" becomes the longest-running No. 1 song by a male solo artist since the start of the charts in 1944, bumping three songs that had been tied for first with 21 weeks: "I'll Hold You in My Heart (Till I Can Hold You in My Arms)" by Eddy Arnold (1947), "I'm Movin' On" by Hank Snow with the Rainbow Ranch Boys (1950), and "In the Jailhouse Now" by Webb Pierce (1955). On August 12, the song's 25th week at No. 1, Hunt bumps Florida Georgia Line's "Cruise" for lengthiest No. 1 run (previously 24 weeks) in chart history; the song eventually logs 34 weeks at No. 1, finally dropping from the top spot (to No. 2) on the chart dated October 21. The song's long-running popularity is attributed in part due to downloads and live streaming, and its No. 6 peak on the Billboard Hot 100 chart, all without a music video for the track.
 September 8 – Troy Gentry, half of the duo Montgomery Gentry, is killed in a helicopter crash in New Jersey.
 September 9 – The radio countdown program American Country Countdown returns to using the Billboard chart as its source after eight years of using the Mediabase chart. The Country Airplay chart is used.
 September 29 - Shania Twain releases her first studio album in nearly 15 years, Now.
 October 1 – A mass shooting occurs at the Route 91 Harvest country music festival in Paradise, Nevada, during a closing performance by Jason Aldean. A shooter fired into the crowd from a 32nd-floor balcony of the Mandalay Bay hotel, located to the southeast of the Las Vegas Village outdoor concert venue. Initial reports indicated that more than 50 people had died and more than 400 were wounded, with those numbers expected to rise, and that the gunman was also dead. Aldean was able to escape uninjured and later posts social media messages confirming his safety. Less than a week later, Aldean pays tribute to the victims and others impacted by the events in Las Vegas by appearing on Saturday Night Live, giving words of support before performing Tom Petty's "I Won't Back Down"; the tribute also honors Petty, who died the day after the shooting.
 October 1 – Loretta Lynn returns to the stage after a near 5-month absence from the spotlight after suffering a stroke on May 4, at her Hurricane Mills, Tennessee Ranch. Lynn sung three of her hit songs at a concert at her ranch which include "Coal Miner’s Daughter," "You Ain’t Woman Enough" and "Dear Uncle Sam."

Top hits of the year
The following songs placed within the Top 20 on the Hot Country Songs, Country Airplay, or Canada Country charts in 2017:

 Singles released by American artists 

 Singles released by Canadian artists 

 Notes 
"—" denotes releases that did not chart

 Top new album releases 
The following albums placed on the Top Country Albums charts in 2017:

 Other top albums 

 Deaths 
 January 5 – Sam Lovullo, 88, co-creator and producer of Hee Haw.
 January 25 – Butch Trucks, 69, founder and drummer of The Allman Brothers Band
 March 11 – Don Warden, 87, best known for his years on The Porter Wagoner Show and as the manager of Wagoner and Dolly Parton.
 April 20 – Tammy Sullivan, 53, bluegrass singer known as half of the Grammy nominated father-daughter duo Tammy and Jerry Sullivan.
 May 21 – Wendell Goodman, 81, manager and husband of Wanda Jackson who penned her 1961 hit "Right or Wrong".
 May 27 – Gregg Allman, 69, singer-songwriter and musician, founder of The Allman Brothers Band.
 June 8 – Norro Wilson, 79, singer-songwriter and producer (heart failure).
 July 13 – Kayton Roberts, 83, steel guitar player who has performed with Dolly Parton, Hank Snow, Marty Stuart and Alison Krauss among others (stroke).
 July 21 – Geoff Mack, 94, Australian singer-songwriter best known for writing "I've Been Everywhere", famously covered by Hank Snow and Johnny Cash among others
 July 25 – Billy Joe Walker Jr., 64, American musician, record producer, and songwriter.
 July 25 – Michael Johnson, 72, country and pop singer from the 1970s and 1980s.
 July 27 – D. L. Menard, 85, Louisiana musician commonly known as the "Cajun Hank Williams".
 August 8 – Glen Campbell, 81, country and pop singer and musician from the 1960s onwards, best known for songs such as "Gentle on My Mind", "Rhinestone Cowboy" and "Southern Nights" (Alzheimer's Disease).
 August 16 – Jo Walker-Meador, 93, first ever full-time employee of the Country Music Association who later became its longest-serving director and was instrumental in making the genre what it is today, overseeing the creation of the CMA Awards, CMA Festival and Hall of Fame (stroke).
 September 8 – Don Williams, 78, country singer known as the "Gentle Giant": known for songs such as "Tulsa Time", "It Must Be Love" and "Good Ole Boys Like Me".
 September 8 – Troy Gentry, 50, half of Montgomery Gentry (helicopter crash)
 October 1 – Kenny Beard, 58, songwriter best known for co-writing "Where the Stars and Stripes and the Eagle Fly" by Aaron Tippin (natural causes)
 November 19 – Mel Tillis, 85, legendary Opry star and Hall of Fame member known for hits such as "Coca-Cola Cowboy", "Good Woman Blues" and "I Ain't Never" (respiratory failure).
 December 16 – Richard Dobson, 75, singer-songwriter.
 December 27 – Curly Seckler, 98, American bluegrass musician (Foggy Mountain Boys, Nashville Grass).

 Hall of Fame inductees 
 Bluegrass Hall of Fame inductees 
 Hazel Dickens and Alice Gerrard
 Bobby Hicks
 Roland White

 Country Music Hall of Fame inductees 
 Alan Jackson, singer-songwriter and leading figure in the neotraditionalist movement of the 1990s, songwriter (born 1958).
 Jerry Reed, singer-songwriter-guitarist best known for swamp rock style of music (1937–2008).
 Don Schlitz, songwriter (born 1952)

 Canadian Country Music Hall of Fame inductees 
 Paul Brandt (born 1972)
 Harvey Gold

 Major awards 

 Academy of Country Music 
(presented in Las Vegas on April 15, 2018)Entertainer of the Year – Jason AldeanMale Vocalist of the Year – Chris StapletonFemale Vocalist of the Year – Miranda LambertVocal Duo of the Year – Brothers OsborneVocal Group of the Year – Old DominionNew Male Vocalist of the Year – Brett YoungNew Female Vocalist of the Year – Lauren AlainaNew Vocal Duo/Group of the Year – MidlandSongwriter of the Year – Rhett AkinsAlbum of the Year – From A Room: Volume 1 (Chris Stapleton)Single of the Year – "Body Like a Back Road" (Sam Hunt)Song of the Year – "Tin Man" (Jack Ingram, Miranda Lambert, Jon Randall)Vocal Event of the Year – "The Fighter" (Keith Urban featuring Carrie Underwood)ACM Honors (presented August 23 in Nashville)
 Cliffie Stone Icon Award – George Strait
 Merle Haggard Spirit Award – Eric Church
 Mae Boren Axton Award – Reba McEntire and Bob Kingsley
 Poet's Award – Willie Nelson, Toby Keith and Shel Silverstein
 Gary Haber Lifting Lives Award – Dolly Parton
 Gene Weed Milestone Award – Kelsea Ballerini
 Songwriter of the Year – Lori McKenna
 Tex Ritter Film Award – Nashville

 Americana Music Honors & Awards Album of the Year – A Sailor's Guide to Earth (Sturgill Simpson)Artist of the Year – John PrineDuo/Group of the Year – Marty Stuart and his Fabulous SuperlativesSong of the Year – "It Ain't Over Yet" (Rodney Crowell)Emerging Artist of the Year – Amanda ShiresInstrumentalist of the Year – Charlie SextonSpirit of Americana/Free Speech Award – Graham NashLifetime Achievement: Trailblazer – Iris DeMentLifetime Achievement: Songwriting – Van MorrisonLifetime Achievement: Performance – Robert CrayLifetime Achievement: Instrumentalist – Hi Rhythm SectionLifetime Achievement: Executive – Larry Sloven and Bruce BrombergWagonmaster Award – Jim Lauderdale

 American Music Awards 
(presented in Los Angeles on November 19, 2017)Favorite Male Artist – Keith UrbanFavorite Female Artist – Carrie UnderwoodFavorite Group or Duo – Little Big TownFavorite Album – Ripcord by Keith UrbanFavorite Song – "Blue Ain't Your Color" by Keith Urban

 ARIA Awards 
(presented in Sydney on November 17, 2017)Best Country Album – Dragonfly (Kasey Chambers)ARIA Hall of Fame – Daryl Braithwaite

 Canadian Country Music Association Apple Music Fans' Choice Awards – Dean BrodyAlbum of the Year – Side Effects by Dallas SmithFemale Artist of the Year – Meghan PatrickMale Artist of the Year – Brett KisselGroup or Duo of the Year – The Road HammersSingle of the Year – "Autograph" by Dallas SmithVideo of the Year – "I Didn't Fall in Love with Your Hair" by Brett KisselSongwriter of the Year – "Time" by Dean BrodyRoots Artist of the Year – The Washboard UnionInteractive Artist of the Year – Brett KisselSirusXM Rising Star – Meghan PatrickCCMA Discovery Award – Kalsey KulykTop Selling Album – Ripcord by Keith Urban

 Country Music Association Awards
(presented on November 8, 2017, in Nashville)Entertainer of the Year – Garth BrooksMale Vocalist of the Year – Chris StapletonFemale Vocalist of the Year – Miranda LambertNew Artist of the Year – Jon PardiVocal Duo of the Year – Brothers OsborneVocal Group of the Year – Little Big TownMusician of the Year – Mac McAnallySingle of the Year – "Blue Ain't Your Color" (Keith Urban)Song of the Year – "Better Man" (Taylor Swift)Album of the Year – From A Room: Volume 1 (Chris Stapleton)Musical Event of the Year – (Glen Campbell and Willie Nelson)Music Video of the Year – "It Ain't My Fault" (Brothers Osborne)

 CMT Music Awards 
(presented in Nashville on June 7, 2017)Video of the Year – "Blue Ain't Your Color" (Keith Urban)Male Video of the Year – "Blue Ain't Your Color" (Keith Urban)Female Video of the Year – "Church Bells" (Carrie Underwood)Group/Duo Video of the Year – "H.O.L.Y." (Florida Georgia Line)Breakthrough Video of the Year – "Road Less Traveled" (Lauren Alaina)CMT Performance of the Year – "Want to Want Me" (Jason Derulo and Luke Bryan)CMT Artists of the Year (presented on October 18, 2019, in Nashville)
Jason Aldean
Luke Bryan
Florida Georgia Line
Chris Stapleton
Keith Urban

 Grammy Awards 
(presented in New York on January 28, 2018)Best Country Solo Performance – Either Way (Chris Stapleton)Best Country Duo/Group Performance – Better Man (Little Big Town)Best Country Song – Broken Halos (Mike Henderson, Chris Stapleton)Best Country Album – From A Room: Volume 1 (Chris Stapleton)Best Bluegrass Album – All The Rage Vol. 1 (Rhonda Vincent) and Defying Gravity (The Infamous Stringdusters)Best Americana Album – The Nashville Sound (Jason Isbell)Best American Roots Performance – Killer Diller Blues (Alabama Shakes)Best American Roots Song – If We Were Vampires (Jason Isbell)Best Roots Gospel Album – Sing It Now: Songs of Faith & Hope (Reba McEntire)

 International Bluegrass Music Association Awards 
(presented on September 27, 2017)Entertainer of the Year – The Earls of LeicesterMale Vocalist of the Year – Shawn CampFemale Vocalist of the Year – Brooke AldridgeVocal Group of the Year – Flatt LonesomeInstrumental Group of the Year – Michael Cleveland and FlamekeeperEmerging Artist of the Year – Volume FiveGuitar Player of the Year – Molly TuttleBanjo Player of the Year – Noam PikelnyMandolin Player of the Year – Sierra HullFiddle Player of the Year – Patrick McAvinueBass Player of the Year – Alan BartramDobro Player of the Year – Josh SwiftAlbum of the Year – Mountain Voodoo (Balsam Range)Song of the Year – "I Am A Drifer" (Volume Five)Recorded Event of the Year – "I've Gotta Get a Message to You" (Bobby Osborne and friends)Instrumental Recorded Performance of the Year – "Fiddler's Dream" (Michael Cleveland)Gospel Recorded Performance of the Year – "I Found A Church Today" (The Gibson Brothers)

 Juno Awards 
(presented in Vancouver on March 24–25, 2018)Country Album of the Year – Game On (James Barker Band)'

Notes

References

Other links 
 Country Music Association
 Inductees of the Country Music Hall of Fame

Country
Country music by year